Audaux is a commune in the Pyrénées-Atlantiques department in the Nouvelle-Aquitaine region of south-western France.

Geography
Audaux is located some 18 km south of Orthez and 6 km north-west of Navarrenx. Access to the commune is by the D27 road from Bugnein in the south-east passing through the south of the commune and the village and continuing to Laàs in the west. The D427 branches off the D27 in the commune and goes to Castetbon in the north. The D947 highway passes through the north of the commune as it goes from Bastanès in the south-east to Orthez. Apart from the village there is the hamlet of Geup west of the village and Lacamoire in the north of the commune on the D947. The commune is mixed forest and farmland with most of the land area farmland.

The Gave d'Oloron forms all of the south-western border as it flows north-west to join the Gave de Pau forming the Gaves réunis at Peyrehorade. The Barthes forms the eastern border of the commune as it flows south to join the Gave d'Oloron. The Ruisseau de Labaigt flows south through the centre of the commune and through Geap to join the Gave d'Oloron. The Saleys river flows across the north of the commune from east to west and it continues north-west to join the Gave d'Oloron east of Saint-Pé-de-Léren.

Places and hamlets

 Andréou (ruins)
 Anglade
 Arées
 Aureyte (fountain)
 Baherle
 Bendéjac
 Camous
 Camp des Maures
 Capdeville
 Les Carrérasses
 Casenave
 Castet
 Coos
 Coustet
 L'Esquille
 Geup
 Hountet
 Hourpélat
 Hourquabillé
 Hourracq
 Laborde
 Lacamoire
 Lafouillère
 Lalanne
 Mirassou
 Le Moulin
 La Pépinière
 Perdigué
 Puyalou
 Saut
 Les Vignes

Neighbouring communes and villages

Toponymy
The commune name in béarnais is Audaus. Michel Grosclaude proposed a possible etymology from an Aquitaine man's name Aldene with the suffix -os.

The following table details the origins of the commune name and other names in the commune.

Sources:
Grosclaude: Toponymic Dictionary of communes, Béarn, 2006 
Raymond: Topographic Dictionary of the Department of Basses-Pyrenees, 1863, on the page numbers indicated in the table. 
Cassini: 

Origins:
Marca: Pierre de Marca, History of Béarn.
Duchesne: Duchesne collection volume CXIV 
Insinuations: Insinuations of the Diocese of Oloron 
Cassini: Cassini Map from 1750
Census: Census of Béarn
Reformation: Reformation of Béarn
Castetner: Notaries of Castetner
Gassion: Enumeration of Gassion
Camptort: Titles of Camptort
Military: Military Inspection of Béarn
Enumeration: Enumeration of Audaux

History
Paul Raymond noted on page 16 of his 1863 dictionary that in 1385 the commune depended on the bailiwick of Navarrenx and had 84 fires. Audaux was dependent of the Marquis of Gassion.

Administration

List of Successive Mayors

Inter-communality
The commune is part of eight inter-communal structures:
 the Communauté de communes du Béarn des Gaves;
 the AEP association of Navarrenx;
 the Energy association of Pyrénées-Atlantiques;
 the association for promotion of Navarrenx;
 the association for schools in Gaveausset;
 the inter-communal association for sanitation Audaux - Bugnein 2 AB;
 the inter-communal association for the Gaves and the Saleys river;
 the joint oak forest association for the basque and bearnais valleys;

Demography
In 2017 the commune had 164 inhabitants.

Audaux has a very high proportion of non-permanent population (e.g. pupils in boarding schools): 31% (73 of 237) as of 2017. This is due to the private boarding school of Sainte-Bernadette having 110 students boarding there.

Economy
Economic activity in the commune is mainly agricultural. The commune lies in the Appellation d'origine contrôlée (AOC) zone of Ossau-iraty.

Culture and heritage

Since 1991 the village has held a rally of hot air balloons on the second weekend in July.

Civil heritage

The commune has one building that is registered as a historical monument:
The Chateau of Audaux (1659). Since 1943 the chateau has belonged to the Foundation of Apprentices of Auteuil who have established a private scholastic institution called DSainte-Bernadette. Although it is a private castle, it can be visited with a historian guide during Heritage Day on the 2nd Sunday in September, on open days for the institution in late May, and during the "Castle Festival" in mid-July.

Facilities

Education
The commune has an elementary school as well as the private institution of Sainte-Bernadette which has a college, a professional school, and a masonry apprenticeship unit.

Notable people linked to the commune
Isaac de Porthau, called Porthos, was a French military man born at Pau on 2 February 1617. He was the inspiration for Alexandre Dumas for the fictitious character Porthos in his novel The Three Musketeers. He came from a Béarnais Protestant family originally from Audaux.

See also
Communes of the Pyrénées-Atlantiques department

External links
Audaux Commune website 
Audaux on Géoportail, National Geographic Institute (IGN) website 
Audaux on the 1750 Cassini Map

References

Communes of Pyrénées-Atlantiques